Los amores de la Inés (The Loves of Inés) is a zarzuela in one act, two scenes, composed by Manuel de Falla in collaboration with Amadeu Vives. The work uses a Spanish language libretto by Emilio Dugi (Mannel Osorio y Bertrand) and the music is organized into a prelude and five musical sections.

The zarzuela was premiered at the Teatro Cómico in Madrid on 12 April 1902. It was the only example of de Falla's five zarzuelas to be actually produced. It has been performed again in 2013, at the Teatro de la Zarzuela, Madrid.

Roles

References
Notes

Sources

Operas by Manuel de Falla
Operas by Amadeo Vives
Spanish-language operas
1902 operas
Operas
Zarzuelas